Highgate is a London Underground station and former railway station in Archway Road, in the London Borough of Haringey in north London. The station takes its name from nearby Highgate Village. It is on the High Barnet branch of the Northern line, between East Finchley and Archway stations, and is in Travelcard Zone 3.

The station was originally opened in 1867, on the Great Northern Railway's line between Finsbury Park and Edgware stations. As part of their only partially completed Northern Heights plan, the London Underground started serving the station in 1941, using new platforms in tunnels beneath the surface station. The platforms of the surface station remain, but were last used in 1954; the section of the line through them to Finsbury Park was closed in 1970 and lifted by 1972. One of the original 1867 station buildings still exists and is in use as a private house.

History

Original station

Highgate station was originally constructed by the Edgware, Highgate and London Railway in the 1860s on its line from Finsbury Park station to Edgware station.  Before the line was opened, it was purchased in July 1867 by the larger Great Northern Railway (GNR), whose main line from King's Cross ran through Finsbury Park on its way to Potters Bar and the north. The station opened along with the railway to Edgware on 22 August 1867.

Due to the hilly terrain, the station was built in a deep cutting excavated from Highgate Hill, adjacent to Archway Road. Tunnels penetrated the hillside at each end of the station, leading towards East Finchley to the north and Crouch End to the south. When built, the station had two side platforms, with three tracks between them, and a station building on the south side. A footbridge linked the two platforms.

A branch line was constructed from Highgate to Alexandra Palace by the Muswell Hill Railway (MHR) and was opened on 24 May 1873. The new branch split from the original route north of the station in a wide arc around Highgate Wood. The next station on the branch line, when it opened, was Muswell Hill and an intermediate station was built later at Cranley Gardens in 1902.

In the 1880s, the station was rebuilt, with two tracks flanking a central island platform instead of the two side platforms. The island platform was accessed from a ticket office in the middle of the footbridge. In 1911, the MHR branch was taken over by the GNR. After the Railways Act 1921 created the Big Four railway companies, the GNR became part of the London & North Eastern Railway (LNER) in 1923.

At the start of the 1930s, the station had around 54 trains daily from High Barnet, 43 from Alexandra Palace and a few through trains from Edgware. Services ran to Finsbury Park and then either King's Cross, Moorgate or Broad Street.

Northern Heights project

In 1935, the London Passenger Transport Board (LPTB) announced a proposal, which became known as the Northern Heights project. This was to take over the LNER lines from Finsbury Park to Edgware, High Barnet and Alexandra Palace, then link them to both the Northern line at East Finchley and the Northern City line at Finsbury Park. The construction of the first phase of this project involved extending tube train services from the Northern line's existing terminus at Archway station (then also called Highgate), through a new section of paired tunnels under Highgate station to emerge south of East Finchley station, where track connections to the LNER line were made.

To provide an interchange between the new deep-level platforms and the existing surface platforms, a subterranean concourse was constructed immediately beneath the existing station. The concourse was connected to the deep-level platforms with escalators and to the existing platforms by stairs. Street entrances to the concourse were provided from the south (Archway Road) and the north (Priory Gardens). At the same time, the buildings on the surface platforms were partly reconstructed and the footbridge was removed. Northern line services through the new tunnels to East Finchley started operating on 3 July 1939, although they did not stop at Highgate until later.

Wartime

Following the outbreak of the Second World War in September 1939, works to complete the electrification of the LNER lines were slowed or halted. The line from Finchley Central to Edgware closed for reconstruction on 11 September 1939. Northern line services were extended from East Finchley to High Barnet on 14 April 1940  and started serving the deep level platforms at Highgate on 19 January 1941, though not all of the new station buildings had been completed. The surface platforms at Highgate continued to be served by LNER steam trains.

With the interchange between LNER and Northern line services available at Highgate from January 1941, LNER trains to East Finchley ended on 2 March 1941, after which they operated between Finsbury Park and Alexandra Palace only. In 1942, LNER services through Highgate were reduced to rush hour only operations. During the war, the deep-level platforms at Highgate were used, as many were, as a shelter from the bombing of London by the Luftwaffe and, later, V-1 and V-2 missiles.

Post-war

After the war, plans to complete the Northern Heights project were reviewed. In early 1946, the conversion of the LNER line from Mill Hill East to Edgware was scheduled by the LPTB for completion between January 1947 and June 1948. No work was carried out as maintenance works and reconstruction of war damage on the existing network had the greatest call on London Underground funds. Funds for new works were severely limited and priority was given to the completion of the western and eastern extensions of the Central line to West Ruislip, Epping and Hainault. Despite being shown as under construction on Underground maps as late as 1950, work never restarted on the unimplemented parts of the Northern Heights project.

After a temporary closure between October 1951 and January 1952, British Railways (the successor to the LNER) ran the last passenger services between Finsbury Park and Alexandra Palace on 3 July 1954. British Railways freight traffic continued to pass through the station until 1964. After freight traffic ceased, the line continued to be used for occasional London Underground rolling stock transfers between Highgate depot and the Northern City line, with the stock being pulled over the unelectrified lines by battery locomotives. This ceased in 1970, due to the poor condition of some of the intermediate bridges, and the track was lifted through the surface platforms in 1972.

Completion of the station buildings was delayed for many years. Designed by the architect Charles Holden, the pre-war plans included a large entrance building at the top of the hill next to The Woodman public house with a pair of escalators between the entrance and the sub-surface concourse. These were to be enclosed in an inclined structure down the side of the cutting parallel with the surface tracks. Taking inspiration from the local legend, the building would have been topped by a statue of Dick Whittington and his cat. When works were finished in 1957, a single and upwards only escalator was provided to take passengers from the sub-surface ticket hall up to a simple exit at the top of the cutting.

One of the GNR's station buildings remains on the north side of the surface platforms: it is used as a private residence. Much of the route between Finsbury Park and Alexandra Palace now forms part of the Parkland Walk, although this bypasses the station site for safety reasons.

Current station 
The current station consists of a central subterranean ticket hall, with escalators leading down to 2 separate 9-car long platforms. There are 2 entrances to the station: one leading to Priory Gardens on the east and the Archway Road to the south. This entrance is directly opposite the Jacksons Lane Arts Centre. There is also a one-way escalator leading to a simple exit north of the station.

Services and connections

Services
The station is in Travelcard Zone 3, between Archway and East Finchley stations. Train frequencies vary throughout the day, but generally operate every 3–7 minutes between 06:01 and 01:01 northbound and 05:37 and 00:18 southbound (as of 2015).

Connections
As of 2015, London Bus routes 43, 134 and 263 and night bus route N20 serve the station.

Use in media
The disused platforms and tunnels have sometimes been used for filming and have appeared in several productions including the feature film Paperhouse, and the television series EastEnders and Waking the Dead.

Births
 Jerry Springer, 1944

Notes and references

Notes

References

Bibliography

External links

 London Transport Museum Photographic Archive
 
 
  Buildings on Archway Road are visible beyond, showing depth of cutting in which the surface station was built.

Northern line stations
Former Great Northern Railway stations
Tube stations in the London Borough of Haringey
Railway stations in Great Britain opened in 1867
Charles Holden railway stations
Tube station
London Underground Night Tube stations
Unopened Northern Heights extension stations